Mark Heap (born 13 May 1957) is an English actor and comedian. He is known for his roles in television comedies, including, Brass Eye, Big Train, Spaced, Jam, Green Wing, Friday Night Dinner, Upstart Crow and Benidorm.

Early life
Heap was born in Kodaikanal, Tamil Nadu, India, to an English father and American mother, the youngest of four boys. He began his acting career in the 1980s as a member of the Medieval Players, a touring company performing medieval and early modern theatre, and featuring stilt-walking, juggling and puppetry. His brother, Carl Heap who is also an actor, was the artistic director of the company. After its demise, he became part of the street theatre duo The Two Marks (with Mark Saban) who appeared on television shows Ghost Train, Saturday Live and 3-2-1.

Television
Heap has appeared in a variety of television comedy roles, often playing eccentric and self-deluded characters and drama including struggling artist Brian Topp in Spaced, the pompous Dr. Alan Statham in Green Wing, and various roles in the sketch show Big Train, many scenes of which he improvised, most notably performing a barefoot gymnastics routine to Montagues and Capulets.

He has worked in a number of ventures with Chris Morris, appearing in Jam, its radio predecessor Blue Jam, and the documentary parody series Brass Eye. He voiced the lead character of Eric Feeble in the animated comedy Stressed Eric. Other recurring roles included Terry Roche in Paul Whitehouse's comedy-drama Happiness and Derek Few in How Do You Want Me?. He played Harry in the short-lived Rob Grant TV series The Strangerers, aired in 2000. He also guested in the second series of the BBC comedy Look Around You as Leonard Hatred.

He appeared in the 2007 BBC One drama Hotel Babylon as an unsuccessful businessman who became a bellboy. Between 2008 and 2010 he appeared in 32 episodes of the BBC period drama Lark Rise to Candleford as head postman Thomas Brown, as well as super villain Lightkiller in an episode of the sitcom No Heroics. He also appears as the father of Chris Miles in the Channel 4 programme Skins. Heap played the love interest of the main character in the second series of the BBC comedy Love Soup. He played the role of Charles Dickens in the 2009 BBC Two drama Desperate Romantics. He also played Jessica Hynes' husband in the one-off comedy Lizzie & Sarah, written by Hynes and Julia Davis.

In 2010, Heap appeared as Bob Stevens, the leader of a rambling group in the BBC4 series The Great Outdoors. He also appeared as a psychiatrist in Miranda Hart's comedy Miranda on BBC2. In October 2010, he appeared as Robin in the four-part BBC drama Single Father. Heap played Jim Bell in the Channel 4 sitcom Friday Night Dinner alongside Simon Bird, Paul Ritter, Tom Rosenthal and Tamsin Greig. He also played Andrew Thorogood in the BBC Four comedy Holy Flying Circus and Jonas in the 8th episode of E4's sci-fi comedy-drama Misfits series 3. He also appeared as a misguided church minister in the BBC Series The Indian Doctor during an outbreak of smallpox.
He joined the cast of the Sky1 original series Spy for its second series commencing in October 2012, replacing Tom Goodman-Hill as Philip Quil, Judith's partner and Marcus' headteacher. He appeared in the spin-off episode of Outnumbered, the Christmas special episode, aired on 24 December 2012 in which he portrayed Norris, for this single episode. He played the owner of a pet crematorium in Sue Perkins's 2013 comedy Heading Out. Mark also had a leading role in BBC Radio 4's adaptation of Gogol's 'Dead Souls.' He starred as Robert Greene in three series of Upstart Crow (2016–2018), a BBC 2 sitcom about Shakespeare, written by Ben Elton. His co-stars included David Mitchell, Harry Enfield, Rob Rouse, Gemma Whelan and Liza Tarbuck. He also appeared as Dr. John Hall in the stage show based on the programme.

Heap also starred in recent series of the sitcom Benidorm, in which he played the character Malcolm Barrett, the controlling and manipulative boyfriend of Pauline Maltby.
Heap's 2020 roles continued, playing headmaster and husband in ITV's The Trouble with Maggie Cole alongside Dawn French.

Film
In 1983, Heap made a brief appearance as a torch-juggler in the James Bond film Octopussy. He played Duncan, Rik Mayall's hapless personal assistant, in Bring Me the Head of Mavis Davis (1997). He played a school teacher in the 2002 film About a Boy. He made a cameo appearance with Kevin Eldon in Tim Burton's 2005 Charlie and the Chocolate Factory. He played supporting roles in Confetti (2006), Tunnel of Love (2004), Stardust (2007), and The World's End (2013). In 2008 he co-starred in the surreal science fiction film Captain Eager and the Mark of Voth.

Filmography

Film

Television

Advertising work
In 2009 he appeared as a car salesman in a SEAT television advert. 

Heap voices the fox in the Old Speckled Hen adverts sponsoring comedy on Dave.

Other acting
In 2008 Heap played the role of Widmerpool in a Radio 4 serialisation of Anthony Powell's A Dance to the Music of Time. He played Eliza's husband in 2006 Radio 4 play The Eliza Stories and appeared as Marmite the Dwarf in the short-lived Radio 4 sitcom The Sofa of Time. He starred in the music video for Four Tet's single "Smile Around the Face" in 2005, contributed a multitude of character voices in the audiobook "Do Ants Have Arseholes?". In 2012 he starred as Martin in the Radio 4 play Cordite for Breakfast, a comedy about Napoleonic-era battle re-enactments. In March 2013, he appeared as Rincewind in a 4-part Radio 4 adaptation of Terry Pratchett's Eric. He also played the angel Aziraphale in the 2014 BBC radio adaption of Neil Gaiman and Terry Pratchett's Good Omens''.

References

External links

Agency profile

20th-century English actors
21st-century English actors
Indian emigrants to England
English puppeteers
Male actors of American descent
English male film actors
English male comedians
English male radio actors
English male television actors
English male voice actors
English people of American descent
Jugglers
People from Tamil Nadu
1957 births
Living people
Indian people of American descent
Indian people of English descent
English expatriates in the United States